The discography of German singer Lena Meyer-Landrut consists of five studio albums, three extended plays, nineteen singles, three promotional singles, one video album and nineteen music videos.

Lena Meyer-Landrut began her recording career in 2010, after winning Unser Star für Oslo (Our Star for Oslo), a television programme to select the German entry for the Eurovision Song Contest. With her three entries from the German national final ("Bee", "Satellite" and "Love Me"), she set an all-time record in Germany by debuting with three songs in the top five of the singles chart. "Satellite" debuted at number one in Germany and was certified double platinum. Following its victory at the Eurovision Song Contest 2010, "Satellite" reached the top spot in Denmark, Finland, Norway, Sweden, Switzerland and the European Hot 100. In May 2010, Meyer-Landrut released her debut studio album, My Cassette Player, which debuted at number one on the albums chart in Germany and Austria, and number three in Switzerland. The album was certified five times gold in Germany for shipments of 500,000 copies. The second official single from the album, "Touch a New Day", debuted and peaked at number thirteen in Germany and number twenty-six in Austria.

Her second album, Good News, was released on 8 February 2011 and debuted at number one on the German album charts. The song "Taken by a Stranger" won Unser Song für Deutschland on 18 February 2011 and was released as the album's lead single on 22 February 2011. Her third album, Stardust, was released on 12 October 2012. It debuted at number 2 in Germany was certified gold. It was preceded by the single "Stardust" which was released on 21 September 2012. It debuted at number 2 in Germany and was certified gold. Her fourth album, Crystal Sky, was released on 15 May 2015. It was preceded by the single "Traffic Lights", which was released on 1 May 2015. Her fifth album Only Love, L was released on 5 April 2019 and was preceded by the singles "Thank You" and "Don't Lie to Me".

Albums

Studio albums

Extended plays

Singles

As lead artist

Promotional singles

As featured artist

Other charted songs

Other appearances

Videos

Video albums

Music videos

References

Notes

Sources

External links
 
 Lena Meyer-Landrut at Musicbrainz

Discographies of German artists
Pop music discographies